Udai Prakash Arora (born 1944) is an Indian Historian well known for his pioneering works in the
field of Graeco-Indian Studies.

Early life

Career 
He started his teaching
career at Allahabad University (1965–1985). Thereafter, he was Professor
and Founder Head, Department of Ancient History and Culture, MJP Rohilkhand University, Bareilly (1985–2006), where he also acted as
Pro Vice Chancellor (1995) and twice as Acting Vice Chancellor
(1996–2006). In 2006 he was invited by Jawaharlal Nehru University,
New Delhi to occupy the position of its prestigious Greek Chair
Professor. After his retirement he was reappointed Visiting Professor
of Greek Studies in JNU in which capacity he still continues.

Professor Arora is an author of 4 books and edited 13. Among his
important publications include Motifs in Indian Mythology, Their Greek
and other Parallels (1981), Graeco-Indica (1991), Greeks on India
(1996), Yunan Itihas aur Samskriti (in Hindi 2010), and Alexander and India (in press). He has contributed nearly 120 articles in various journals. He is founder General Secretary of Indian Society for Greek and Roman Studies and edits its annual journal Yavanika. He was General President UP History Congress (1996–97) and Sectional President (Ancient India) Indian History Congress (2002).

Awards 
As a visiting fellow he has visited U.S., Canada, and several countries in Europe, Asia and Africa. His contribution earned him the most prestigious Greek civilian honor Golden Cross-Order of Honor from the President of Greece (1996). In his honor was published the Felicitation Volume Udayana-New Horizons in History Classics, and Intercultural Studies (2006).

References

 Greek Sources on India: Alexander to Megasthenes

External links
 Bareilly Mart

Living people
20th-century Indian historians
Historians of India
1944 births